The 1953 Pacific Tigers football team represented the College of the Pacific during the 1953 college football season.

Pacific competed as an independent in 1953. They played home games in Pacific Memorial Stadium in Stockton, California. In their first season under head coach Jack Myers, the Tigers finished with a record of four wins, four losses and two ties (4–4–2). For the season they outscored their opponents 191–172.

Schedule

Notes

References

Pacific
Pacific Tigers football seasons
Pacific Tigers football